Quamby is a tiny settlement in Northwest Queensland, 44 kilometres from the town of Cloncurry. The town rests on the eastern side of the Burke Developmental Road and these days consists of a solitary hotel, fifteen 'dongas' (single workers accommodation) and a handful of sheds, watertanks and memorabilia from nearby stations.

The historic feel extends to the interior of the hotel where old timber and floorboards have been used to make tables while donated saddles, horse shoes and old railway lights add decoration.
Quamby is attached to the Parish of Corella in the County of Beaconsfield.  The town is in the jurisdiction of the Cloncurry Shire Council.

The Quamby hotel was originally built as a Customs House in the 1860s and converted to a hotel somewhere around 1921. It was also used as a staging post for Cobb & Co stagecoaches who required fresh teams of horses every 10 – 30 miles.
The Quamby State School operated from 1924 until 1969.
In the 1930s the town is reputed to have had 40 homes but the demise of the railway saw most of the existing buildings relocated as is common with the stumped, timber frame houses of north Queensland. In 1934 Quamby was also the scene of what was described at the time as a 'Shooting Affray'. Mr Charles Cameron, a schoolteacher, shot Mr James Croke after a dispute in Mr Croke's home. Croke was taken to hospital in a critical condition while Charles Cameron was later found dead in his hotel room at The Quamby Hotel. The police noted a pea rifle was nearby.
Cattle grazing and mining are the significant industries in the region. Local pastoral holdings include 'Dipvale', 'Carsland', 'Malakoff' and 'Bannock Burn'. Mining interests in the region have been predominantly gold and copper with many small operations existing since settlement. A major mine expansion is currently underway just north of Quamby at Dugald River. Project capital expenditure is expected to be in the range of US$1–1.25 billion.
Quamby is a popular inclusion on the Queensland Rodeo Circuit with novelty events such as the 'Donkey Ride' and 'Calf Scruffing' proving popular with competitors and spectators. It's held in July and attracts up to 1300 spectators and 280 competitors.

References 

Unbounded localities in Queensland